Nambu may refer to:

Firearms
 Nambu pistol, a Japanese firearm
 New Nambu M60, a Japanese revolver
 New Nambu M66
 Nambu Type 90
 Type 94 Nambu pistol
 7×20mm Nambu
 8×22mm Nambu

People with the surname
 Chūhei Nambu (1904–1997), Japanese track-and-field athlete
 , Japanese cyclist
 Kenzo Nambu (born 1992), Japanese footballer
 Kijirō Nambu (1869–1949), Japanese gunmaker
 Yoichiro Nambu (1921–2015), Japanese American theoretical physicist

Other uses
 Nambu language or Nambo-Namna, of Papua New Guinea
 Nambu languages, of Papua New Guinea
 Nambu (station), on the Busan Subway
 Nambu Line, a railway line between Tokyo and Kanagawa, Japan
 National Union of General Workers (Zenrokyo), in Japan

See also
 
 Nanbu (disambiguation)

Japanese-language surnames